Novonikolayevka is a rural locality (a village) in Skvorchikhinsky Selsoviet, Ishimbaysky District, Bashkortostan, Russia. The population was 67 as of 2010. There are 11 streets.

Geography 
Novonikolayevka is located 22 km southeast of Ishimbay (the district's administrative centre) by road. Osipovka is the nearest rural locality.

References 

Rural localities in Ishimbaysky District